The 1988 Canadian Grand Prix was a Formula One motor race held on 12 June 1988 at the Circuit Gilles Villeneuve, Montreal. It was the fifth race of the 1988 Formula One World Championship. The 69-lap race was won from pole position by Brazilian driver Ayrton Senna, driving a McLaren-Honda, with French teammate Alain Prost second and Belgian Thierry Boutsen third in a Benetton-Ford.

Report

Qualifying
The Canadian Grand Prix returned to the Formula One calendar after a year's absence. In the meantime, major changes had been made to the Circuit Gilles Villeneuve: the start-finish line, pit lane and facilities had been moved from the top end of the track to the bottom end, necessitating the removal of two turns, while other turns had been re-profiled slightly.

The McLarens once again dominated qualifying, with Ayrton Senna taking his fifth consecutive pole position by just under 0.2 seconds from Alain Prost. The Ferraris of Gerhard Berger and Michele Alboreto filled the second row, while the Benetton of Alessandro Nannini was the fastest of the naturally-aspirated cars in fifth, just under 2.3 seconds behind Senna. Nelson Piquet was sixth in his Lotus, followed by Thierry Boutsen in the second Benetton, Eddie Cheever in the Arrows and Nigel Mansell in the Williams, while Philippe Streiff put in a strong performance to take tenth, which would turn out to be the best-ever grid position for the AGS team. Also achieving its best-ever grid placing was EuroBrun, as Stefano Modena took 15th.

The Saturday session saw Derek Warwick suffer a big accident in his Arrows. Turning into the chicane into the new start-finish straight, Warwick slid on dirt kicked up moments before by Streiff's AGS. The Arrows spun onto the inside kerb and became airborne, then bounced several times before hitting what is now known as the "Wall of Champions" at unabated speed. Warwick was briefly knocked unconscious and hurt his back; he received aid from fellow Briton Mansell, who had suffered a similar crash at Suzuka the previous year. However, Warwick was declared fit to race and took up his 16th position on the grid.

During qualifying, Williams team owner Frank Williams announced that he had concluded a deal with Renault that would see the team have exclusive use of the French company's V10 engines from the  season onwards. Williams said that "for better or worse you need an association with a major manufacturer to be successful in Formula One".

Race
At the start, Prost led away from Senna, the Ferraris and the Benettons. After ten laps, Berger began having issues with the fuel system of his Ferrari. On lap 19, Senna passed Prost at the L'Epingle hairpin as they came up to traffic, the Brazilian driver thus taking a lead he would not lose. Nannini retired from fourth position on lap 15 with electrical trouble, while Berger retired with similar problems on lap 23. Meanwhile, Mansell passed his old rival Piquet in the Lotus, before his Judd engine failed on lap 29; teammate Riccardo Patrese suffered the same fate four laps later.

On lap 34, Alboreto retired with an engine failure, promoting Boutsen to third. With many of the front runners out, minor teams had a clear chance of scoring points. By the middle of the race Philippe Streiff had brought his AGS up to fifth place, ahead of Andrea de Cesaris' Rial in sixth. However, Streiff retired on lap 41 with a rear suspension failure, while de Cesaris ran out of fuel with three laps to go. This promoted Ivan Capelli in the March to fifth and Jonathan Palmer in the Tyrrell to sixth.

Senna finished just under six seconds ahead of Prost, with Boutsen a further 45 seconds back. Piquet was fourth in the Lotus, albeit a lap down on Senna, with Capelli and Palmer completing the top six. Warwick, despite his injury, finished just outside the points in seventh, having battled with teammate Cheever until the American retired on lap 31 with a broken throttle cable.

Senna set the fastest lap of the race on lap 53 with a time of 1:24.973. Boutsen's third place marked the first time since the 1983 Dutch Grand Prix that a naturally-aspirated car had legally finished on a Formula One podium.

Classification

Pre-qualifying

Qualifying

Race

Championship standings after the race

Drivers' Championship standings

Constructors' Championship standings

References

External links

Canadian Grand Prix
Canadian Grand Prix
Grand Prix
Grand Prix